is a Prefectural Natural Park in Tottori Prefecture, Japan. Established in 1984 and expanded in 1987, the park comprises part of the coast and three inland areas of the expanded city of Tottori (former towns of Aoya, Ketaka, and Shikano).

See also
 National Parks of Japan

References

External links
 Detailed map of Nishi Inaba Prefectural Park

Parks and gardens in Tottori Prefecture
Protected areas established in 1984
1984 establishments in Japan